Huntingtower is a 1928 British silent adventure film, made at Cricklewood Studios. It was directed by George Pearson and starred Harry Lauder, Vera Voronina and Patrick Aherne. It was based on the 1922 novel Huntingtower by John Buchan. The film was fairly successful on its release.

Plot
The film is "(a) tale of chivalry in modern times, involving a Glasgow grocer and a Russian princess imprisoned in a deserted castle" according to the British Film Institute.

Cast
Harry Lauder as Dickson McCunn
Vera Voronina as Princess Saskia
Patrick Aherne as Capt. John Heritage
Lillian Christine as Mrs. McCunn
John Manners as Prince Paul
Moore Marriott as Speidel
Douglas Herald as Leon
Susanne Morris as Mother
W. Cronin Wilson as Dobson
Nancy Price as Mrs.Moran
Jerrold Robertshaw as Father
Harry Malonie as Dougal

Production
The castle scenes were shot at Bamburgh Castle.

References

Bibliography
 Low, Rachel. The History of British Film: Volume IV, 1918–1929. Routledge, 1997.

External links

 Huntingtower at Silent Era
 Archive footage from 1928 of Harry Lauder visiting the Regent Picture House, Glasgow, to view the film

1928 films
1920s English-language films
Films based on British novels
Films based on works by John Buchan
British silent feature films
Paramount Pictures films
Films shot at Cricklewood Studios
Films set in Scotland
British black-and-white films
British adventure drama films
1920s adventure drama films
1928 drama films
1920s British films
Silent drama films
Silent adventure films